Charles Ryerson McGeoch (September 12, 1899 – May 25, 1985) was an American football player and coach. He served as the head football coach at Massachusetts Agricultural College—now the University of Massachusetts Amherst from 1928 to 1930, compiling record of 6–17–2.

McGeoch attended the Northfield Mount Hermon School in Gill, Massachusetts and then Massachusetts Agricultural College, where he played college football from 1922 to 1924. After graduating, he coached at the Salisbury School in Salisbury, Connecticut. In 1931, McGeoch was hired as an assistant coach at Malden High School in Malden, Massachusetts to work under head coach Warren McGuirk.

Head coaching record

College

References

1899 births
1985 deaths
UMass Minutemen baseball players
UMass Minutemen football coaches
UMass Minutemen football players
High school football coaches in Connecticut
High school football coaches in Massachusetts
Northfield Mount Hermon School alumni
People from Bridgewater, Massachusetts
Sportspeople from Plymouth County, Massachusetts
Players of American football from Massachusetts
Coaches of American football from Massachusetts
Baseball players from Massachusetts